Berlin Atonal is an annual festival for sonic and visual art in two distinct stages. It first took place between 1982 and 1990, relaunching in 2013 under new direction and continuing to the present day. The festival presents contemporary, interdisciplinary projects at the intersection of sound art, visual and media art, installation and performance, with an emphasis on commissioned work and world premieres. Apart from the annual event, Berlin Atonal has presented other satellite events such as The Long Now, New Assembly in Tokyo, and has collaborated with Deutsches Symphonie-Orchester, Dark Mofo and Berliner Festspiele.

History
Originally staged at SO36 in Kreuzberg, the early years of Atonal fostered revolutionary and innovative musical acts such as Malaria!, Einstürzende Neubauten, Test Dept, Laibach, Psychic TV, 808 State, Die Haut among many others. Throughout the 1980s Berlin Atonal was at the vanguard of the progressive electronic and experimental music and art scenes, and worked to coalesce these emerging sounds in Berlin and worldwide into a more cohesive movement. The festival closed in 1990 as founder Dimitri Hegemann’s focus turned to founding the techno club Tresor.

Current
In 2013, Berlin Atonal was relaunched at its new permanent home, Kraftwerk, a massive former powerplant, on the cusp of the Mitte and Kreuzberg areas of Berlin, under new directorship. The festival activates the powerplant for a week each year, dedicating its 8,000 square meters to featuring high concept A/V shows, site-specific performances and installations, world premiere commissions and collaborations, screenings and workshops. Each year sees hundreds of individual musicians, choreographers, sound and visual artists performing and presenting their work. The festival is now regarded as one of the most influential sonic arts events in the world. “Berlin Atonal is arguably the city’s most impressive music and arts festival,” wrote critic Megan King in 2017, “spanning a fascinating thirty-year story that is entwined with the history of the city itself.” Berlin Atonal, she argued in Culture Trip, coined Berlin as “a city that originated serious, existentialist music.”

Commissioned works and artists
Each year the festival plays host to several commissioned works. Among the artists and new collaborations who have produced new work for the festival or one of its side projects, or contributed with a specially devised project are: Actress, Alessandro Cortini, Alvin Lucier, Anika Schwarzlose, Autechre, Bruce Conner, Cabaret Voltaire, Caterina Barbieri, Clock DVA, Cyprien Gaillard, Glenn Branca, Iancu Dumitrescu, John Gerrard, Jon Hassell, Le Syndicat Electronique, Leslie Winer, Lillian Schwartz, Mark Lanegan, Mick Harris, Mika Vainio, Paul Jebanasam, Peter Burr, Peter Zinovieff, Shackleton, Surgeon, Strawalde, Susanne Winterling, Tino Sehgal, Tony Conrad, Wang Bing, Wolfgang Tillmans, Zhao Liang.

Side-projects
The Long Now is a collaboration between Berlin Atonal and Berliner Festspiele, closing the ten-day MaerzMusik festival, taking place every March since 2015. The project assembles concerts, performances, electronic live-acts, sound and video installations to form a composition in time and space over 30+ continuous hours, inducing the crowd to immersive experiences of longevity and unconsciousness.

Laterne is a curated programme for Australian art museum MONA’s Dark Mofo festival.

Parallax was a joint project between Berlin Atonal and Deutsches Symphonie-Orchester, with a programme of orchestral music from the baroque era to modern micropolyphony.

Berlin Atonal Recordings is a record label set up to accompany the festival, releasing excerpts of live performances from the festival.

See also
List of electronic music festivals
List of industrial music festivals
List of experimental music festivals
Live electronic music

References

External links

 1982 Atonal festival at SO36 photo by Peter Lind

Festivals in Berlin
Music in Berlin
Experimental music festivals
Electronic music festivals in Germany
Electroacoustic music festivals
Music festivals established in 1982
Industrial music festivals
1982 establishments in Germany